The Sacramento Mountain salamander (Aneides hardii) is a species of salamander in the family Plethodontidae. It is endemic to mountainous regions of New Mexico in the United States. Its natural habitat is temperate forests where it is threatened by habitat loss.

Distribution and habitat
The Sacramento Mountain salamander occurs in three separate mountainous areas in New Mexico, the Capitan Mountains, the Sierra Blanca range and the Sacramento Mountains. It typically occurs on north or east facing slopes among Douglas fir, Engelmann spruce and white fir, often with an understory of Rocky Mountain maple. It often  hides in the leaf litter or rotten logs, under rocks, fallen branches or vegetation. Above the tree line it is found in stony areas with mosses and lichens.

The only other salamander occurring in this area is the tiger salamander (Ambystoma tigrinum) and that is more of a lowland species and prefers grasslands, savannahs and woodland edges.

Biology
The Sacramento Mountain salamander feeds on small invertebrates such as ants, rove beetles, springtails, snails and spiders. It is itself preyed on by the western terrestrial garter snake (Thamnophis elegans).

Breeding takes place in the summer with eggs being laid in small clutches inside rotten logs and stumps and also possibly in underground cavities.

Status
The Sacramento Mountain salamander is assessed as near threatened in the IUCN Red List of Threatened Species. It is common in the areas in which it occurs and is chiefly threatened by logging activities especially when associated with fire or the removal of fallen timber. Under current logging practices, it is believed that populations are stable.</ref>

References

Aneides
Amphibians described in 1941
Taxonomy articles created by Polbot